Thomas Andrew Donnellan (January 24, 1914 – October 15, 1987) was an American prelate of the Catholic Church who served as the ninth bishop of the Diocese of Ogdensberg in New York from 1964 to 1968, and as the second archbishop of the  Archdiocese of Atlanta in Georgia from 1968 until his death in 1987.

Biography

Early life and ministry
The eldest of two children, Thomas Donnellan was born on January 24, 1914, in Bronx, New York, to Andrew and Margaret (née Egan) Donnellan. After graduating from Regis High School in the Bronx in 1931, Donnellan entered St. Joseph's Seminary in 1933.

Donnellan was ordained to the priesthood by then-Archbishop Francis Spellman on June 3, 1939. In 1942, Donnellan received a doctorate in Canon Law from The Catholic University of America in Washington, D.C.

Upon graduation, Donnellan was appointed as assistant pastor of St. Patrick's Cathedral in New York, eventually becoming Cardinal Spellman's secretary in 1954. In 1962, Donnellan became the rector of St. Joseph's Seminary in Yonkers, New York.

In June 1954, Pope Pius XII named Donnellan as papal chamberlain in March 1958 and later to domestic prelate. In December 1962, Pope John XXIII elevated Donnellan to the rank of prothonotary apostolic.

Bishop of Ogdensburg
On February 28,1964, Pope Paul VI appointed Donnellan as bishop of the Diocese of Ogdensburg.  He was consecrated on April 9, 1964, by Cardinal Francis Spellman in St. Patrick's Cathedral, and installed on April 13.

Archbishop of Atlanta

On May 29, 1968, following the death of Archbishop Paul Hallinan, Bishop Donnellan was appointed by Paul VI as the second archbishop of Atlanta; he was installed on July 16, 1968.. During his 19-year tenure, Donnellan guided the archdiocese through extensive growth, with the number of Catholics in North Georgia nearly tripling from 50,000 in 1968 to over 133,000.

With his tenure as head of a Southern archdiocese beginning in the wake of the assassination of civil rights leader Martin Luther King Jr., Donnellan dealt with many issues regarding the civil rights movement In January 1970, he barred new enrollments in the archdiocese's Catholic schools as a gesture of support to the integration of local public school systems.

In 1984, Donnellan was one of the co-authors of Economic Justice For All: Catholic Social Teaching and the U.S. Economy, which was unveiled at a meeting of the National Conference of Catholic Bishops.  The document urged a moral perspective in viewing the economy from the vantage point of the nation's poor.

Death and legacy 
In May 1987, Donnellan suffered a stroke.  Thomas Donnellan died on October 15, 1987, in Talantia. His funeral was held at the archdiocese's mother church, Cathedral of Christ the King, and was attended by over 1,000 mourners, with then-Apostolic Pro-Nuncio in the U.S. Archbishop Pio Laghi as principal celebrant.

Archbishop Donnellan is buried at Arlington Cemetery in Sandy Springs, Georgia.  The Archbishop Donnellan School opened in 1996. It is now known as Holy Spirit Preparatory School.

See also

 Catholic Church hierarchy
 Catholic Church in the United States
 Historical list of the Catholic bishops of the United States
 List of the Catholic bishops of the United States
 Lists of patriarchs, archbishops, and bishops

Footnotes

External links
Biography of Archbishop Donnellan from the Archdiocese of Atlanta
Roman Catholic Archdiocese of Atlanta
Roman Catholic Diocese of Ogdensburg

1914 births
1987 deaths
Roman Catholic archbishops of Atlanta
Participants in the Second Vatican Council
Roman Catholic bishops of Ogdensburg
Saint Joseph's Seminary (Dunwoodie) alumni
Catholic University of America alumni
20th-century Roman Catholic archbishops in the United States